Cloghan is a town in County Offaly, Ireland. It is located at the intersection of the N62 National secondary road and the R356 and R357 regional roads.

Amenities
Cloghan had (as of 2016) a population of 601, and is home to a car dealership, and has a number of shops including a butchers, a hairdressers/beautician and a Spar store. Cloghan once had five public houses in 1994 but, as of January 2016, had only one remaining.

Cloghan has one national (primary) school, St. Mary's National School.

Transport
Cloghan is located at the intersection of the N62 national secondary road, and the R356 and R357 regional roads. This intersection is known locally as "The Square".

Belmont and Cloghan railway station opened on 29 May 1884, closed for passenger traffic on 24 February 1947, and finally closed altogether on 1 January 1963.

Sport
St. Rynagh's GAA club are based in Cloghan and play their games at the local sports field. The club was founded in 1961 and has since won 16 Offaly Senior Hurling Championships and 5 Offaly County Intermediate Football Championships. The Cloghan pitch is used for Gaelic football, while the pitch in Banagher is used for the club's hurling games and training.

People
 YouTuber Jacksepticeye, born Seán McLoughlin, is originally from the town.

See also 
 List of towns and villages in Ireland

References

Towns and villages in County Offaly